

A 

A